Naso lituratus is a species of fish in the family Acanthuridae, the tangs and unicornfishes. Its common names include barcheek unicornfish, naso tang, and orange-spine unicornfish.

Unique to members of Acanthuridae, including Naso lituratus, are the Epulopiscium bacteria. These bacteria influence the digestion of Naso lituratus, helping them process the algae in their diet.

Naso lituratus can be found in the Indian Ocean and the Pacific Ocean. This species can be easily recognised by two bright orange forward-hooked spines on the caudal peduncle (the tail base), its orange lips and black face mask. The body is brownish grey with yellow nape and there is a broad black band on the dorsal fin. It reaches about 45 cm in length.

It can be found on coral reefs, often in pairs.

Description and biology
The features of Naso lituratus include orange lips, a caudal peduncle with a brash-hooked spine, and a black face mask. The descriptions of these features include one dorsal fin on top of head and is encircled by a broad black band around 45 centimeters long. They barely grow in size. Long anal fin with II spines and 28–30 soft rays, and a continuous, unnotched dorsal fin with VI spines and 27–30 soft rays. Contains 8 to 9 gill rakers on the lower leg whereas the upper limb has 4. There are 6 spines in total, each with 26–29 soft rays. Adipose fins don't exist. There is one anal fin, two spines overall, and between 27 and 30 soft rays on it. The pectoral and pelvic fins are two of its paired fins. The pectoral fin contains 17–18 soft rays and 0 spines. The pelvic fin has a single spine and three soft rays. In adult males, the lobe's apex produces a lengthy filament. Caudal fin is lunate or crescent-shaped. Two sharp blades that point forward are on the caudal peduncle. In Juveniles, their blades are not fully grown, as they have a stifling gray-brown tint with black, yellow, and white patterns. No forehead "horns" or front protuberance that can be seen in certain other Acanthuridae species.

Distribution and habitat
The Location of the Naso Lituratus lay in the East Indian and Pacific Ocean, with their habitat is living in the coral reefs that lay around in those specified oceans. The reproduction of this species are that the sexes are separate among the Acanthuridae and have distinct differences in size. Spawning occurs year round in Guam. They need high oxygen levels, strong water currents, same companions and need to feed on wild algae. Their self defense tactic are that their naso tangs will extend their strong tail spines to strike any approaching predators.

Human use
Humans have barely any use of Naso lituratus other than the fact that they are very good to eat and can be used as pets and stored in aquariums.

References

https://www.aquaticcommunity.com/marinefish/orangespineunicornfish.php
https://www.iucnredlist.org/species/177950/1500256
https://onlinelibrary.wiley.com/doi/10.1111/mec.13050
https://link.springer.com/article/10.1007/s002270050473
https://www.sciencedirect.com/science/article/abs/pii/0300962994903522?via%3Dihub

External links
 

lituratus
Fish of Hawaii
Fish of Palau
Fish described in 1801